Sir Robert Ramsay Mackenzie, 10th Baronet (21 July 1811 – 19 September 1873) was a pastoralist and politician in Queensland, Australia. He was  Premier of Queensland, Australia from August 1867 to November 1868.

Early life
Mackenzie was born in Coul, Ross-shire, Scotland, fourth son of Sir George Steuart Mackenzie, and wife Mary, fifth daughter of Donald Macleod of Geanies, Ross-shire.

New South Wales
In April 1832 Mackenzie arrived on the Wave in Sydney, New South Wales, with £750 joining his brother James. He purchased sheep for £500 and grazed them at Riddlesdale (near Dungog, New South Wales). After land speculation with his brother James, Robert Mackenzie bought a station, got into debt and borrowed money from his Scottish relatives. His financial situation worsened and he was declared bankrupt in 1844. In 1846 he was discharged from bankruptcy and was appointed a magistrate in 1847, living in Clifton, New England.

Political career
Queensland was declared a separate colony in 1859, Mackenzie entered politics and became Colonial Treasurer on 15 December 1859 in the ministry of Robert Herbert. Mackenzie represented Burnett in the Legislative Assembly of Queensland 1860–1869. Mackenzie formed a government on the resignation of Arthur Macalister, taking on the roles of both Premier and Colonial Treasurer. He resigned on 25 November 1868.

Personal life
Robert Mackenzie married Louise Alexandrina Jones, daughter of Richard Jones, a member of the New South Wales Legislative Council, Sydney, in 1846. One of their daughters, Mary Louisa, married Alexander Archer, a brother of Archibald Archer. Both Mary and Alexander died in the 1890 sinking of the RMS Quetta.

Robert Mackenzie succeeded his brother William on his death on 21 December 1868 to the baronetcy and returned to live on the family estate in Scotland in 1871.  Sir Robert died at 6 Atherstone Terrace, Queen’s Gate Gardens, London on the 19th September, 1873.

See also
 Members of the Queensland Legislative Assembly, 1860–1863; 1863–1867; 1867–1868; 1868–1870

References

R. B. Joyce, 'Mackenzie, Sir Robert Ramsay (1811 - 1873)', Australian Dictionary of Biography, Volume 5, MUP, 1974, pp 171–172.
 

Additional resources listed by the Australian Dictionary of Biography

C. A. Bernays, Queensland Politics During Sixty Years (Brisb, 1919)
J. F. Campbell, ‘Discovery and early pastoral settlement of New England’, JRAHS, 8 (1922)
Brisbane Courier, 28 July 1862
The Times (London), 24 September 1873, p 5
P. D. Wilson, The Political Career of Hon. A. Macalister (B.A. Hons thesis, University of Queensland, 1969)
Bankruptcy papers, 1250 (State Records New South Wales)
Land and Colonial Secretary's files (Queensland State Archives).

1811 births
1873 deaths
Premiers of Queensland
Baronets in the Baronetage of Nova Scotia
Scottish emigrants to colonial Australia
Younger sons of baronets
Treasurers of Queensland
19th-century Australian politicians
Members of the Queensland Legislative Assembly